Year 1332 (MCCCXXXII) was a leap year starting on Wednesday (link will display the full calendar) of the Julian calendar.

Events 

 February 18 – Amda Seyon I, Emperor of Ethiopia, begins his campaigns in the southern Muslim provinces (possibly in 1329).
 August 10–11 – Battle of Dupplin Moor: Edward Balliol rebels, and the English defeat the loyalists of David II in Scotland.
 September – Edward Balliol crowns himself King of Scotland.
 November 7 – Lucerne joins the Swiss Confederation with Uri, Schwyz, and Unterwalden.
 December 16 – Battle of Annan: The loyalists of David II defeat Edward Balliol in Scotland.
 The city of Marosvásárhely (in Transylvania, today Târgu Mureș in Romania) is first documented in the papal registry, under the name Novum Forum Siculorum.

Births 
 May 27 – Ibn Khaldun, North African Arab historian (d. 1406)
 June 8 – Cangrande II della Scala, Lord of Verona (d. 1359)
 June 16 – Isabella de Coucy, English princess, daughter of King Edward III of England (d. 1379 or 1382)
 June 18 – John V Palaiologos, Byzantine Emperor (d. 1391)
 October 10 – King Charles II of Navarre (d. 1387)
 date unknown
 Pero López de Ayala, Spanish soldier (d. 1407)
 Elizabeth de Burgh, 4th Countess of Ulster (d. 1363)
 Andrea Vanni, Italian painter (d. c. 1414)
 Hanna van Recklinghausen, Dutch banker
 Xu Da, Chinese military leader (d. 1385)
 Approximate
 William Langland, English poet (d. c.1400)
Catherine of Vadstena, Swedish saint (d. 1381)

Deaths 
 January 8 – Andronikos III Megas Komnenos, Emperor of Trebizond
 February – Henry Hussey, 1st Baron Hussey (b. c. 1265)
 February 13 – Andronikos II Palaiologos, Byzantine Emperor (b. 1259)
 March 13 – Theodore Metochita, Byzantine Empire statesman, author, man of learning, and patron of the arts (b. 1270)
 June 16 – Adam de Brome, founder of Oriel College, Oxford
 July 20 – Thomas Randolph, 1st Earl of Moray, regent of Scotland
 August 2 – King Christopher II of Denmark (b. 1276)
 August 11 – at the Battle of Dupplin Moor 
Domhnall II, Earl of Mar
 Robert II Keith, Marischal of Scotland
 Thomas Randolph, 2nd Earl of Moray
 Murdoch III, Earl of Menteith
 Robert Bruce, Lord of Liddesdale
 September 4 – García de Ayerbe, Spanish bishop and crusade theorist
 date unknown
 Jayaatu Khan, Emperor Wenzong of Yuan, emperor of the Yuan Dynasty (b. 1304)
 Rinchinbal Khan, Emperor Ningzong of Yuan, emperor of the Yuan Dynasty (b. 1326)
 approximate date – Mary of Woodstock, English princess (b. 1279)

References